Destined With You is an upcoming South Korean television series starring Rowoon, Jo Bo-ah, Ha Jun, and Yura. It is scheduled to premiere on original broadcaster JTBC in 2023. It will also be available for streaming on Netflix.

Synopsis
Destined With You tells the story about an irresistible romance between Lee Hong-jo (Jo Bo-ah) and Jang Shin-yu (Rowoon) with the storyline revolving around a forbidden book that was thoroughly sealed 300 years ago, landing in the hands of Hong-jo after obtaining it with Shin-yu becoming the victim of the forbidden book due to the curse caused by the book.

Cast

Main
 Rowoon as Jang Shin-yu
 Jo Bo-ah as Lee Hong-jo
 Ha Jun
 Yura

Supporting
 Lee Pil-mo
 Jung Hye-young
 Park Kyung-hye
 Lee Bong-ryun

Production

Release
On January 17, 2023, Netflix released the first still of Rowoon and Jo Bo-ah.

References

External links
 

JTBC television dramas
Korean-language television shows
Television series by JTBC Studios
South Korean romance television series
2023 South Korean television series debuts

Upcoming television series